Cloudia Swann is an English actress.

Life and career
Cloudia Swann was born in Leicestershire, and spent her early years living in Stratford-upon-Avon where she attended Bromsgrove School until the age of 13. Swann later attended Cheltenham College for her A-Levels before a 3-year Acting Diploma at the Oxford School of Drama. 

Swann graduated from the Oxford School of Drama in 2005 when she landed her first screen leading role opposite Jesper Christanson as Alice in an Independent Feature Shaking Dreamland. In 2006 she landed a 3 part series Dream Team 80s Hewland Productions for Sky TV before playing a semi regular role for BBC Scotlands River City. In 2007 Swann landed leading role Sophie in Shine Productions Dis/connected directed by Tom Harper, as part of the BBC 3 Pilot season. Swann played Mark Addy's daughter from the north for ITV Bike Squad directed with Guy Jenkin where she later worked with him on his comedy Fried Brain Sandwich for Sony Pictures.

Swann had a small role in an episode of Demons which screened in February 2009, and also appeared in independent film, Shoot on Sight directed by Jag Mundhra starring Brian Cox and Greta Saatchi about the 7/11 bombings in London.

In 2010, Swann was cast in the Award Winning The Great Game Afghanistan, Tricycle Theatre. A British series of short plays on the history of Afghanistan and foreign intervention there, from the First Anglo-Afghan War to the present day, Directed by Nicolas Kent and Indhu Rubasingham. Swann played six different characters from a young Afgahn girl in Black Tulips to Simon Stephens Canopy of Stars where she portrayed a wife confronting her Sergeant Husband about returning to War. The success of the US Tour resulted in a return to Washington DC early 2011 for two exclusive performances for The Pentagon.

Prior to this Swann guested in many well known TV shows such as police drama The Bill, Doctors and Hollyoaks. Swann appeared in the Multi Million Rowntrees Randoms Campaign playing a random primary school teacher which was aired across the UK. Other company commercials in which Swann has appeared include telecommunications company Orange, Vageta and the Co-op.

She starred in a stage production of Mice and Men at the Dukes Theatre in Lancaster. In September 2011 she completed filming Real Playing Game a thriller starring a cast from around Europe, produced by MGN Filmes Tino Navarro.

Film

Television

Theatre

Other work

References

1. http://news.bbc.co.uk/local/lancashire/hi/things_to_do/newsid_8246000/8246828.stm
Of mice and Men BBC Lancashire Radio Interview and Images

2. http://www.eveningtimes.co.uk/designer-babe-set-to-shake-up-shieldinch-1.972933
River City – The Evening Times Profile on Cloudia Swann

3. http://www.denofgeek.com/television/249802/lily_allen_eyes_doctor_who_role.html
Doctor Who

4. https://web.archive.org/web/20120402073753/http://www.eaglefilms.co.uk/Shaking%20Dream%20Land/press/cloudia_swann.html
Shaking Dreamland Film Press Page

5. http://www.thestage.co.uk/reviews/review.php/25682/of-mice-and-men
Of Mice and Men – The Stage Review

6. http://www.digitalspy.co.uk/tv/tubetalk/a91028/preview-new-teen-drama-disconnected.html?start=2
Dis/connected – Shine Productions Film

7. http://virtual-lancaster.blogspot.com/2009/10/in-review-of-mice-and-men.html
Of Mice and Men – Virtual Lancaster

8. https://web.archive.org/web/20111002204513/http://www.berkeleyrep.org/press/photos-10gg.asp
The Great Game – Berkley Rep

9. http://outwestarts.blogspot.com/2010/12/my-ten-and-only-best-of-theater-10.html
The Great Game – 10 of the best Review

10. http://www.variety.com/review/VE1117943942?refCatId=33
The Great Game Variety Review

11. http://outwestarts.blogspot.com/2010/10/like-poppies.html
The Great Game Review

12. http://www.bbc.co.uk/programmes/b00v4m2g
BBC radio 3 Canopy of Stars

13. http://www.britishtheatreguide.info/reviews/greatgame10-rev.htm
The Great Game (review)

14. http://www.britishtheatreguide.info/reviews/greatgame10-rev.htm
The Great Game(review)

15. http://www.theatreindc.com/playdetail.php?playID=174
The Great Game (Washington DC)

16. http://www.huffingtonpost.com/lauren-gunderson/theatre-of-the-right-now-_b_774123.html
(Berkley US Review)

17. http://www.washingtonian.com/blogarticles/artsfun/afterhours/16812.html
(Washington The Great Game Review)

18. http://theater.nytimes.com/show/25491/The-Great-Game-Afghanistan-/overview
(New York Times – Overview of cast)

19. http://dctheatrescene.com/2010/09/21/the-great-game-afghanistan-part-2/
The Great Game Review

20. https://web.archive.org/web/20120514111357/http://www.stagevoices.com/stage_voices/2010/12/the-great-game-afghanistan-in-new-york-review.html
(New York performance standout)

21. http://www.zimbio.com/Afghanistan/articles/eyZdZh3VS8Z/Olivier+Nominated+Great+Game+Afghanistan+Arrives
http://www.abouttheartists.com/productions/30957
(Minneapolis Programme – The Great Game)

External links

1. https://www.imdb.com/name/nm2014175/
(Cloudia Swann IMDB Page).

2. https://www.youtube.com/watch?v=BPRwHxXbCZc
(Cloudia Swann as a teacher in Rowntree's Randoms Advert).

Year of birth missing (living people)
Living people
People from Oadby
English television actresses
English stage actresses
People educated at Bromsgrove School
Actresses from Leicestershire
People educated at Cheltenham College
Alumni of the Oxford School of Drama